The British Basketball League (BBL) is a men's professional basketball league in Great Britain and represents the highest level of play in the countries. The league is contested by 10 teams from England and Scotland. There are no clubs however from Wales or Northern Ireland. The BBL runs three additional knockout competitions alongside the BBL Championship which are the BBL Cup, the BBL Trophy and the end-of-season BBL Play-offs.

The BBL sits above the National Basketball League and the Scottish Basketball Championship which effectively form the second tier of British basketball. There is currently no automatic promotion or relegation between the English and Scottish leagues and the BBL because of the franchise system in use in the BBL although several clubs have been successful in making the step up from the EBL in recent years.

The 10 member franchises of the BBL jointly own the league and a chairman is elected by the teams to oversee league operations. The head offices are located in Leicester where the country's oldest team the Leicester Riders are also based.

In partnership with Basketball England the BBL launched a women's league in 2014 branded as the Women's British Basketball League (WBBL).

History
See: List of British Basketball League seasons

Establishment (1987–1992)
The British Basketball League was formed in 1987, with leading clubs from the National Basketball League of England and Scottish National Basketball League.  In 1988, Portsmouth F.C. won the inaugural BBL Championship title; the following year saw Kingston win the first of three back-to-back league crowns.

Early growth (1992–2002)
The 1990s also saw a growth in popularity and commercialism within the league.  Games were televised and the league picked up sponsors such as Peugeot, Lego, Playboy and Budweiser, while attendances at games also increased. The Manchester Giants opened the 1995–96 season in front of a record 14,251 fans at the Nynex Arena against the London Leopards, a record crowd for a basketball game in Great Britain. It stood until 2006, when the NBA started staging games at the O2 Arena in London.

London clubs dominated the league, with London Towers, Crystal Palace and the Greater London Leopards all sharing success in the mid-1990s. In 1999, a Conference format similar to the NBA was introduced, with clubs split North and South.  The two Conference champions met in a Championship series to decide the champions for the next three years.

Tougher times (2002–2012)
A single division format returned in 2002 and five different franchises won the Championship title in the five years after that. The new millennium, however, also saw a series of setbacks for the BBL. The collapse of ITV Digital cost the league financially, with many franchises struggling to recover from the lost revenue that the £21 million contract was providing. Long established franchises such as the Manchester Giants, Essex Leopards, Derby Storm, Thames Valley Tigers and Birmingham Bullets withdrew from the league, though new teams have been formed under the Giants and Leopards names. The membership crisis brought about the addition of new franchises such as Guildford Heat (formed by supporters of the defunct Thames Valley Tigers), and elected teams from the lower-tier English Basketball League, including the Plymouth Raiders. Both teams made a refreshing impact on the old boys, with the Heat qualifying for the Play-offs in their rookie season.

During the same season Newcastle won 30 of their 40 regular season league fixtures to clinch the Championship crown – the previous season saw the Eagles win 31 matches but lose out to Chester Jets in the final week, by just two points. That title was one of four pieces of silverware won during the dubbed "clean-sweep" season of 2005–06, the Eagles marching on to claim the BBL Cup, BBL Trophy and Playoff's – the complete set.

Current setup (2012–present)
The intervening years saw the perennial success of the Newcastle Eagles, the reemergence of the Leicester Riders as a dominant force in the domestic game, and the rise and fall of teams based in London, Birmingham, Liverpool, Essex, Durham and Worthing. Long term franchise Milton Keynes relocated to London, to become a 2012 Olympics legacy tenant at the Copper Box Arena, and a new incarnation of the famous Manchester Giants name re-entered the league in the same year.

The 2015 Playoffs Final took place at The O2 Arena, London, following a string of sell-out attendances at Wembley Arena between 2012 and 2014. The event saw a record breaking crowd of 14,700.

The past decade has seen sustained growth across the league, with the biggest advances in facilities. Some clubs have now built their own venues, including Worcester, Newcastle and Leicester. Cheshire, Surrey and Glasgow have moved into much improved facilities, while Plymouth, Sheffield, Manchester and the most recent election from the EBL, the Bristol Flyers, have all announced plans for their own arenas. The 2018–19 season saw, for the first time in 11 years, British participation in European competition when Leicester competed in the Basketball Champions League and FIBA Europe Cup.

On December 2, 2021, the Miami-based investment firm 777 Partners bought 45.5% of the shares of the league. The company invested £7 million in the league, that also saw an organisational reform which included the appointment of a CEO.

Rules 
The BBL had a salary cap in place, named the "Team Payments Cap", which limited teams to spend no more than £250,000 on player salaries. The aim was to keep overall costs down for the teams while also ensuring competitive balance. The salary cap was dropped starting from the 2022-23 season, as it was stated to hamper the growth of BBL teams playing in European competitions.

Teams

Current teams

 Notes

 An asterisk (*) denotes a franchise move. See the respective team articles for more information.
 The Hemel & Watford Royals, Leicester City Riders and Sunderland 76ers were all participants in the previous top-flight league, the NBL, when it changed administration to the BBL in 1987.
 The Cheshire Jets and Sheffield Sharks were both promoted from the NBL in 1991 and 1994 respectively.
 Bristol Flyers (2014) have acquired a franchise licence to compete in the BBL, having previously competed in the EBL.

Proposed new teams

Former teams

Apparel
As of the 2016–17 BBL season Italian sportswear manufacturer Kappa was the kit supplier for all teams.

Corporate structure

Board members
The league is an independent company owned by its member clubs. Each club, or franchise, has an equal shareholding in the BBL and a representative on the board of directors, thus is part of all decision-making regarding league policy, issues, and rules. Sir Rodney Walker is the current elected chairperson.

Chairs
 John Deacon (1987 to 1988)
 Kevin Routledge (1988 to 2002)
 Vince Macaulay (2002 to 2006)
 Paul Blake (2006 to 2013)
 Ed Percival (2013 to 2015)
 Sir Rodney Walker (2016 to present)

Competitions

BBL Championship

The BBL Championship is the flagship competition of the British Basketball League and features all member teams playing a double round robin (home and away) league season, from September through to April. Matches are played according to FIBA rules and games consist of four-quarters of 10 minutes each. Two points are awarded for a win, with overtime used if the score is tied at the final buzzer – unlimited numbers of 5-minute overtime periods are played until one team is ahead when a period ends. At the end of the regular season, the team with the most points is crowned as winners of the BBL Championship, and thus British Champions. If points are equal between two or more teams then head-to-head results between said teams are used to determine the winners. In the case of a tie between multiple teams where this does not break the tie, the winners are then determined by the points difference in the games between said teams. Following the completion of the Championship regular season, the top eight ranked teams advance into the post-season Play-offs which usually take place during April.

In the regular season, team schedules are not identical and neither are matchdays, with games scheduled mainly around venue availability. Because of this teams may find themselves playing a series of four or five home games consecutively followed by a straight set of away games. As the regular season is also particularly short many games are played over weekends as 'doubleheaders', whereby a team will play games (possibly a home and away game) on consecutive days, something that is not commonplace in British sports, although often seen in the National Basketball Association and other North American sports.

Play-offs
The post-season Play-offs usually takes place in April, featuring the top eight ranked teams from the Championship regular season compete in a knockout tournament. Teams are seeded depending on their final positioning in the Championship standings, so first-place faces eighth-place, second versus seventh-place, third against sixth-place and finally fourth plays the fifth-placed team. Both the Quarter-finals and the succeeding Semi-finals are played over a three-game series, with the higher seed getting two home games either side of the lower seeds home game. The team that wins two of the three games advances to the next round. As with the Quarter-finals, teams in the Semi-finals are also seeded, with the highest-ranking team drawn against the lowest-ranking team in one Semi-final and the two remaining teams drawn together in the other Semi-final. The culmination of the post-season is the grand Final, held at The O2 Arena in London, which sees the two Semi-final winners play a one-game event to determine the Play-off Champions.

BBL Cup

The BBL Cup emerged from a breakaway of the English Basketball Association-organised National Cup and was contested for the first time in the 2003–04 season, when Sheffield Sharks were the inaugural winners. Since the 2019–20 season, the competition has a group stage followed by a knockout stage. The group stage consists of the teams being split into north and south groups and within each playing a double round-robin system. The top 4 teams from each group are then seeded with 1st of each group playing 4th in the other and 3rd in each group playing 2nd in the other. The winner of the Aggregate score going through to the semi-final. The winner of the aggregate score of each match in the semi-final then goes through to the BBL Cup Final. The Cup final is played at the Arena Birmingham in Birmingham, usually in early January.

BBL Trophy

The BBL Trophy traces its origins back to a previous competition known as the Anglo-Scottish Cup – and subsequently the British Master's Cup – which was founded in 1984 and was initially a competition between teams from both the English and Scottish leagues. Following the launch of the new British Basketball League administration in 1987 – who assumed control over the National Basketball League from the English Basketball Association – the British Master's Cup was scrapped and replaced with the newly formed League Trophy. The Trophy competition has historically had a round-robin group stage format used for the first round, however the current competition is a knockout tournament with pairings drawn completely at random – there are no seeds, and a draw takes place after the majority of fixtures have been played in each round. As well as including all BBL member clubs, invited teams from the English Basketball League, and occasionally the Scottish Basketball League, often take part in the Trophy. The Final is usually played in March at a neutral venue.

European Competition
In 2018, the Leicester Riders competed in Europe's third tier of continental basketball, the Basketball Champions League, losing in the first qualification round on aggregate to the Bakken Bears. They became the first British team to compete in European competition since the Guildford Heat featured in the ULEB Cup during the 2007–08 season.

Following their elimination from the Basketball Champions League, the Leicester Riders played in the 2018–19 FIBA Europe Cup, Europe's fourth tier.

To be eligible for entry into the Basketball Champions League or the FIBA Europe Cup, teams must play in arenas with a capacity of at least 2,000 people. Currently the BBL member teams that meet the tournaments' requirements are Leicester, Glasgow, London, Newcastle and Worcester. Bristol and Manchester have both begun work on suitable arenas. Worcester were awarded a B-Licence by the EuroLeague, the top tier of European competition, for the 2014–2015 season having won the 2014 BBL Playoffs. Newcastle, London, Glasgow, and Bristol have all signalled their intentions of playing at a European level in the near future.

Players

All-time statistics leaders 
Bold indicates active BBL players.

Last Updated on 20 September 2012

Foreign imports
British Basketball League rules currently allow for each team to have a maximum of three "import" players – from outside of the European Union (EU) and require a work permit to play – whilst the remaining players on the roster must have citizenship of an EU country, either by birth or by naturalisation. The current ruling was integrated at the beginning of the 2006–07 season, reverting from the previous law which allowed for up to four non-EU players on a roster, along with naturalised players.

New rules introduced for the 2012–13 season allow teams to field a maximum of five non-British players per game (including up to three work permitted players), further demonstrating the League's commitment towards developing British players.

Transfer regulations
According to BBL rules, teams must field no more than six import (non-EU) players in any one season, though only three are allowed to be registered to a roster at any one time. Signings are allowed to be made throughout the pre-season and during the regular season until the league's transfer deadline on 28 February, or if during a leap year, the date is 29 February.

Notable former players

  Kieron Achara
  John Amaechi
  Andrew Betts
  Matthew Bryan-Amaning
  Steve Bucknall
  Dave Gardner
  Trevor Gordon
  Skouson Harker
  Chris Haslam
  Roger Huggins
  Iain MacLean
  Richard Midgley
  Robbie Peers
  Peter Scantlebury
  Greg Francis
   Ricardo Greer
  Pero Cameron
   Ted Berry
   Flinder Boyd
  Rod Brown
  Eric Burks
   Alton Byrd
  Terry Crosby
   Tony Dorsey
   Chuck Evans
  Kenny Gregory
   James Life
  Loren Meyer
   Terrell Myers
   Nate Reinking
  Craig Robinson
  Dennis Rodman
   Billy Singleton
  Andre Smith
   Lynard Stewart
  Clyde Vaughan
  Jerry Williams
   Tony Windless
  Voise Winters
   Charles Claxton

Results

League

Present clubs

Historical

Playoffs

Honours board

Media coverage
Basketball receives little national press coverage in the United Kingdom, although coverage is more extensive from the local newspapers in cities where BBL clubs are based, with publications such as The Plymouth Herald, Manchester Evening News, Leicester Mercury and the Newcastle Chronicle all having dedicated basketball reporters who cover the respective local team. Some national newspapers list results and occasionally provide short summaries of the League's news, but more extensive coverage remains minimal.

The history of television coverage of the BBL has been sporadic. Previously the League enjoyed coverage from Channel 4 in the 1980s and Sky Sports from 1995 to 2001, where audiences peaked at around 150,000 viewers.  The League signed a three-year broadcast deal with the ill-fated digital TV company ITV Digital in 2001, and coverage suffered a sharp decline as the broadcaster struggled and eventually went out of business, resulting in a significant loss of income to member clubs.  Television coverage was then infrequent until the 2007–08 season, when international broadcaster Setanta Sports signed a deal to screen one live game a week.  In 2010, the League agreed a broadcast rights deal with BSkyB network Sky Sports marking the return of BBL action on Sky Sports after a 9-year gap.  The League's own subscription-based online TV station, BBL TV, took over the broadcast of live games from 2013 to 2015, and during the 2013–14 season match highlights were also televised and featured on British Eurosport each week.

In July 2016, the league signed a two-year broadcast deal with the BBC, featuring both British Basketball League and Women's British Basketball League games. The games would be broadcast on the BBC Sport website with the showpiece finals also being broadcast on the BBC Red Button. Alongside the BBC deal, a six-year deal with Perform was signed which saw every BBL game broadcast via LiveBasketball.TV, and a deal followed a year later with UNILAD to broadcast one game a week live via Facebook. FreeSports signed a deal with the league in January 2018 to broadcast games for the remainder of the season, starting with the BBL Cup Final between Worcester Wolves and Cheshire Phoenix.

In November 2020, coverage of the league returned to Sky Sports in a new two-year deal which sees Sky broadcasting 30 games per season, including BBL Trophy Final, BBL Cup Final and BBL Playoffs. This has been extended to cover the 2022/23 season.

Awards
Most Valuable Player award
Coach of the Year award
All-Star Team award

See also

 Basketball in England
 National Basketball League (England)
 Super League (Ireland), featuring teams from Northern Ireland and the Republic of Ireland
 Women's British Basketball League
 List of professional sports teams in the United Kingdom
 Timeline of basketball on UK television

Notes

References

External links

 
1
Organisations based in Leicestershire
Professional sports leagues in the United Kingdom
Sport in Leicester
1987 establishments in the United Kingdom
Sports leagues established in 1987